A Benefit for Victims of Violent Crime provided funds to The Center for Victims of Violence and Crime and features five new Anti-Flag studio tracks along with five live songs recorded at Pittsburgh's Mr. Smalls in April 2007. Bassist Chris #2's family experienced the horror of losing a family member when his sister and her boyfriend were both murdered, leaving behind a young daughter and son. Anti-Flag’s reaction when faced with tragedy was to put together this limited edition benefit EP in hopes that it would help others who have gone through similar situations.

Track listing 

Live Songs

Personnel
Justin Sane- Guitar & Lead Vocals
Chris Head- Guitar & Vocals
Chris #2- Bass & Lead Vocals
Pat Thetic- Drums

See also 
 Victims' rights

References 

2007 EPs
Anti-Flag albums
A-F Records albums
Victims' rights